Lawrence Mansion is located in Hamburg, Sussex County, New Jersey, United States. The mansion was built in 1841 and was added to the U.S. National Register of Historic Places on November 2, 1979.

See also
 National Register of Historic Places listings in Sussex County, New Jersey

References

Houses on the National Register of Historic Places in New Jersey
Houses completed in 1841
Houses in Sussex County, New Jersey
National Register of Historic Places in Sussex County, New Jersey
Hamburg, New Jersey
New Jersey Register of Historic Places